The Eintveit Bridge is an unused road bridge in Etne municipality in Vestland county, Norway. Access roads were never built to it, and the bridge has stood secluded and without traffic since it was erected. It goes over the river Eintveitelva between the now-abandoned small farms of Eintveit and Bjelland.

In 1956 the area was a part of Skånevik municipality (later merging with Etne municipality), and in that year the municipal council allocated money to build a bridge across the Eintveitelva with access roads, as part of a larger road project that would follow the coastline along the northern side of the Åkrafjorden. Construction of the bridge began in 1958 and the bridge was completed in 1962. The road along the fjord was never built, and the bridge was never used by anyone other than random hikers. Since the road was not built, all of the small farms along that area of the fjord eventually became abandoned. The bridge falls into the "bridge to nowhere" category.

References

Bridges to nowhere
Road bridges in Vestland
Etne
1962 establishments in Norway